The 2018 FIFA World Cup qualification UEFA Group E was one of the nine UEFA groups for 2018 FIFA World Cup qualification. The group consisted of six teams: Romania, Denmark, Poland, Montenegro, Armenia, and Kazakhstan.

The draw for the first round (group stage) was held as part of the 2018 FIFA World Cup Preliminary Draw on 25 July 2015, starting 18:00 MSK (UTC+3), at the Konstantinovsky Palace in Strelna, Saint Petersburg, Russia.

The group winners, Poland, qualified directly for the 2018 FIFA World Cup. The group runners-up, Denmark, advanced to the play-offs as one of the best eight runners-up.

Standings

Matches
The fixture list was confirmed by UEFA on 26 July 2015, the day following the draw. Times are CET/CEST, as listed by UEFA (local times are in parentheses).

Goalscorers
There were 96 goals scored in 30 matches, for an average of  goals per match.

16 goals

 Robert Lewandowski

8 goals

 Christian Eriksen

7 goals

 Stevan Jovetić

4 goals

 Thomas Delaney
 Fatos Bećiraj

3 goals

 Kamil Grosicki

2 goals

 Ruslan Koryan
 Henrikh Mkhitaryan
 Andreas Cornelius
 Nicolai Jørgensen
 Sergei Khizhnichenko
 Bauyrzhan Turysbek
 Stefan Mugoša
 Žarko Tomašević
 Constantin Budescu
 Adrian Popa
 Bogdan Stancu

1 goal

 Gevorg Ghazaryan
 Artak Grigoryan
 Hovhannes Hambardzumyan
 Varazdat Haroyan
 Aras Özbiliz
 Marcos Pizzelli
 Peter Ankersen
 Kasper Dolberg
 Yussuf Poulsen
 Islambek Kuat
 Gafurzhan Suyumbayev
 Damir Kojašević
 Stefan Savić
 Marko Simić
 Marko Vešović
 Nikola Vukčević
 Jakub Błaszczykowski
 Kamil Glik
 Bartosz Kapustka
 Krzysztof Mączyński
 Arkadiusz Milik
 Łukasz Piszczek
 Rafał Wolski
 Alexandru Chipciu
 Ciprian Deac
 Claudiu Keșerü
 Răzvan Marin
 Alexandru Maxim
 Nicolae Stanciu

1 own goal

 Hrayr Mkoyan (against Poland)
 Filip Stojković (against Poland)
 Kamil Glik (against Denmark)

Discipline
A player was automatically suspended for the next match for the following offences:
 Receiving a red card (red card suspensions could be extended for serious offences)
 Receiving two yellow cards in two different matches (yellow card suspensions were carried forward to the play-offs, but not the finals or any other future international matches)

The following suspensions were served during the qualifying matches:

Notes

References

External links

Qualifiers – Europe: Round 1, FIFA.com
FIFA World Cup, UEFA.com
Standings – Qualifying round: Group E, UEFA.com

E
Poland at the 2018 FIFA World Cup
Denmark at the 2018 FIFA World Cup